Sarah Ann Padden (16 October 1881 – 4 December 1967) was an English-born American theatre and film character actress. She performed on stage in the early 20th century. Her best-known single-act performance was in The Clod, a stage production in which she played an uneducated woman who lived on a farm during the American Civil War.

Early life
Born in England to an Irish immigrant father, Michael Padden, and an English mother, the family emigrated to the United States on the S/S Ohio from England passing through the Port of Philadelphia in 1889.

The future actress took part in recitations in the Catholic school she attended in Chicago, where her fellow students enjoyed her talent as a mimic. Her parents wanted her to enter a convent, but a liberal-minded priest, Father Dorney, encouraged her ambition to become an actress. He assisted her in obtaining her first stage role, a theatrical featuring Otis Skinner.

For many years, Padden lived in the vicinity of the Broad River, Gaston, South Carolina. On one occasion she ventured onto a dam, reaching its center just as the noon whistle blew near the power station. Frightened, she lost her balance and fell over, but she managed to cling to a steel eye bolt. She was rescued by an African American manservant of the power company superintendent. Afterwards Padden's parents hired the man and took him to New York City, where he died at age 108.

Theatrical career
Padden was a featured player on the Orpheum Circuit. She had a role in His Grace de Grammont, a romantic comedy by Clyde Fitch which came to the Park Theatre in Boston in September 1905. The production starred Skinner and was based on the life of a chevalier in the court of Charles II. Padden appeared again with Skinner in a four-act play produced by Charles Frohman, The Honor of the Family, by Émile Fabre, which was presented in New Rochelle, New York in September 1907.

Another of her theatrical parts was in Hell-Bent Fer Heaven, a Pulitzer Prize-winning play by Hatcher Hughes. It was performed at the Wilkes Orange Grove Theater (Majestic Theater), 845 South Broadway (Los Angeles),
in November 1925.

Film

Padden was also an active screen actress from 1926 to 1958, appearing in 178 films and TV shows. In 1938, she played "Ma" Thayer in MGM's Rich Man, Poor Girl, directed by Reinhold Schünzel and starring Robert Young, Ruth Hussey, and Lana Turner. Bill Harrison (Robert Young) a wealthy young businessman moves in with secretary girlfriend Joan Thayer's (Ruth Hussey) eccentric family to convince her they can make their marriage work.

In 1941, she played wealthy spinster Aunt Cassandra ("Cassie") Hildegarde Denham in Murder by Invitation, directed by Phil Rosen and starring Wallace Ford and Marian Marsh. In this "closed room" murder comedy, after they unsuccessfully attempt to have her declared legally insane to gain control of her fortune, her nephews and nieces are invited to a week's visit at her mansion where they are murdered one by one.

Avid golfer
She was athletic, taking part in skating, tennis, and swimming. She played 18 to 36 holes of golf daily. In 1919. she was considered one of the best female golfers in the United States. In Los Angeles, she was fond of playing the municipal links at Griffith Park.

Death
She died 4 December 1967 in Los Angeles, California, at the age of 86. She was buried in Holy Cross Cemetery in Culver City.

Selected filmography

 Obey the Law (1926) - The Mother
 Heroes of the Night (1927) - Mrs. Riley
 Colleen (1927) - Police Lieutenant's Wife
 The Woman Who Did Not Care (1927) - Mrs. Carroll
 The Bugle Call (1927) - Luke's Wife
 Sarah Padden in The Eternal Barrier (1927) (*Vitaphone short)
 Sarah Padden in Souvenirs (1928) (*Vitaphone short)
 Companionate Marriage (1928) - Mrs. Williams
 Wonder of Women (1929) - Anna
 The Sophomore (1929) - Mrs. Collins
 Trifles (1930, Short) - Mrs. Wright
 Hide-Out (1930) - Mrs. Dorgan
 Our Blushing Brides (1930) - Mrs. Hinkle - the Landlady (uncredited)
 Billy the Kid (1930) - Homesteader Mrs. Foster (uncredited)
 Today (1930) - Emma Warner
 The Great Meadow (1931) - Mistress Molly Hall
 Bad Girl (1931) - Mrs. Gardner (uncredited)
 Sob Sister (1931) - Ma Stevens
 The Yellow Ticket (1931) - Mother Kalish (uncredited)
 Mata Hari (1931) - Nursing Sister Teresa (uncredited)
 Cross-Examination (1932) - Mary Stevens
 Grand Hotel (1932) - Chambermaid in Room 174 (uncredited)
 Young America (1932) - Mrs. Mary Taylor
 The Midnight Lady (1932) - Nita St. George
 Red-Headed Woman (1932) - Mary - Legendre Maid (uncredited)
 Rebecca of Sunnybrook Farm (1932) - Mrs. Cobb
 The Washington Masquerade (1932) - Pardoned Boy's Mother (uncredited)
 Blondie of the Follies (1932) - Ma McClune
 Two Against the World (1932) - Mrs. Polansky (uncredited)
 Kongo (1932) - Nun in Convent School (uncredited)
 Wild Girl (1932) - Lize
 Women Won't Tell (1932) - Aggie Specks
 Tess of the Storm Country (1932) - Old Martha
 Rasputin and the Empress (1932) - Duna - Landlady (uncredited)
 Face in the Sky (1933) - Ma Brown
 Pilgrimage (1933) - Mother of Soldier Missing in Action (uncredited)
 The Important Witness (1933) - Deaf Woman
 The Power and the Glory (1933) - Henry's Wife
 Doctor Bull (1933) - Mary the Canning Cook (uncredited)
 Ann Vickers (1933) - Lil-Black Woman
 The Wolf Dog (1933) - Mrs. Stevens
 The Sin of Nora Moran (1933) - Mrs. Watts
 Man of Two Worlds (1934) - Olago
 As the Earth Turns (1934) - Mrs. Janowski
 David Harum (1934) - Widow Cullon
 Men in White (1934) - Rose Smith (uncredited)
 All Men Are Enemies (1934) - Proprietress (uncredited)
 He Was Her Man (1934) - Mrs. Gardella
 Marrying Widows (1934)
 Little Man, What Now? (1934) - Widow Scharrenhofer
 The Defense Rests (1934) - Mrs. Evans
 Tomorrow's Children (1934) - Mrs. Mason
 When Strangers Meet (1934) - Mrs. Tarman
 A Dog of Flanders (1935) - Frau Keller
 The Hoosier Schoolmaster (1935) - Sarah
 Stranded (1935) - Workman's Wife (uncredited)
 Mad Love (1935) - Mother of Lame Girl (uncredited)
 Anna Karenina (1935) - Governess
 The Unborn (1935)
 Youth on Parole (1937) - Mrs. Blair
 Exiled to Shanghai (1937) - Aunt Jane
 Women in Prison (1938) - Martha Wilson
 Three Comrades (1938) - Frau Schultz (uncredited)
 Romance of the Limberlost (1938) - Sarah
 Woman Against Woman (1938) - Dora
 Rich Man, Poor Girl (1938) - Ma
 Little Tough Guys in Society (1938) - Victim (uncredited)
 Little Orphan Annie (1938) - Mrs. Nora Moriarty
 Off the Record (1939) - Mrs. Fallon (uncredited)
 The Adventures of Huckleberry Finn (1939) - Woman Wanting Needle Threaded (uncredited)
 Let Freedom Ring (1939) - 'Ma' Logan
 Man of Conquest (1939) - Houston's Mother (uncredited)
 The Zero Hour (1939) - Sister Theodosia
 Should a Girl Marry? (1939) - Mrs. Wilson
 I Stole a Million (1939) - Lady in Post Office (uncredited)
 The Angels Wash Their Faces (1939) - Mrs. Smith (scenes deleted)
 Forgotten Girls (1940) - Miss Donaldson
 Son of the Navy (1940) - Mrs. Baker - Landlady
 Street of Memories (1940) - Mother (uncredited)
 Lone Star Raiders (1940) - Lydia 'Granny' Phelps
 Chad Hanna (1940) - Mrs. Tridd
 In Old Colorado (1941) - Ma Woods
 The Man Who Lost Himself (1941) - Maid
 City of Missing Girls (1941) - Mrs. Randolph
 A Woman's Face (1941) - Police Matron
 Tight Shoes (1941) - Mrs. Rupert
 Murder by Invitation (1941) - Cassandra 'Cassie' Denham
 Reg'lar Fellers (1941) - Hetty Carter
 Outlaws of Cherokee Trail (1941) - The Nun (uncredited)
 It Started with Eve (1941) - Jenny - Coat Check (uncredited)
 The Corsican Brothers (1941) - Nurse
 Private Snuffy Smith (1942) - Lowizie Smith
 Wild Bill Hickok Rides (1942) - Mrs. Kimball (uncredited)
 The Power of God (1942) - Esther Worne
 Heart of the Rio Grande (1942) - Skipper Forbes
 The Mad Monster (1942) - Grandmother
 This Gun for Hire (1942) - Mrs. Mason (uncredited)
 Lady in a Jam (1942) - Miner's Wife (uncredited)
 The Pride of the Yankees (1942) - Mrs. Roberts (uncredited)
 Law and Order (1942) - Aunt Mary Todd
 Riders of the West (1942) - Ma Turner
 Dr. Gillespie's New Assistant (1942) - Neighbor (uncredited)
 Assignment in Brittany (1943) - Albertine
 Hangmen Also Die! (1943) - Mrs. Georgia Dvorak
 Hostages (1943) - Old Woman (uncredited)
 So This Is Washington (1943) - Aunt Charity Speers
 The North Star (1943) - Old Lady (uncredited)
 Jack London (1943) - Cannery Woman
 The Navy Way (1944) - Mrs. Margaret Gimble (uncredited)
 This Is the Life (1944) - Sarah (uncredited)
 Range Law (1944) - Boots Annie
 Summer Storm (1944) - Beggar Woman (uncredited)
 Trail to Gunsight (1944) - Grandma Wagner
 Casanova Brown (1944) - Mrs. Smith (uncredited)
 San Diego, I Love You (1944) - Mrs. Gulliver (uncredited)
 Girl Rush (1944) - Mrs. Emma Mason
 Ghost Guns (1944) - Aunt Sally
 Three Is a Family (1944) - Middle-Aged Woman (uncredited)
 Identity Unknown (1945) - Mrs. Anderson
 It's in the Bag! (1945) - Woman in Elevator (uncredited)
 The Master Key (1945, Serial) - Aggie
 Honeymoon Ahead (1945) - Mrs. Halett
 The Unseen (1945) - Alberta (uncredited)
 Wildfire (1945) - Aunt Agatha
 Riders of the Dawn (1945) - Melinda Pringle
 Apology for Murder (1945) - Maggie - the Janitress
 Marshal of Laredo (1945) - Mrs. Randall
 Song of Old Wyoming (1945) - Ma Conway
 Dakota (1945) - Mrs. Plummer
 Ideal Girl (1946) - Old lady #1
 Breakfast in Hollywood (1946) - Mrs. Marie Edgedaw (uncredited)
 So Goes My Love (1946) - Bridget
 Joe Palooka, Champ (1946) - Mom Palooka
 Earl Carroll Sketchbook (1946) - Mrs. Murphy (uncredited)
 Angel on My Shoulder (1946) - Agatha (uncredited)
 Gentleman Joe Palooka (1946) - Mom Palooka
 Wild West (1946) - Carrie Bannister
 My Dog Shep (1946) - Aunt Carrie Hodgkins
 That Brennan Girl (1946) - Mrs. Graves, the Nice Landlady
 Trail Street (1947) - Mrs. Ferguson (uncredited)
 Ramrod (1947) - Mrs. Parks
 Love and Learn (1947) - Mrs. Grant (uncredited)
 The Millerson Case (1947) - Emma Millerson (uncredited)
 Possessed (1947) - Mrs. Norris - Caretaker's Wife (uncredited)
 Joe Palooka in the Knockout (1947) - Mom Palooka
 Joe Palooka in Fighting Mad (1948) - Mom Palooka
 The Return of the Whistler (1948) - Mrs. Hulskamp
 The Dude Goes West (1948) - Mrs. Hallahan
 Frontier Revenge (1948) - Widow Owens
 Homicide (1949) - Mrs. Webb
 Range Justice (1949) - Ma Curtis
 The Doctor and the Girl (1949) - Miss Newton (uncredited)
 House by the River (1950) - Mrs. Beach
 Gunslingers (1950) - Rawhide Rosie Rawlins
 A Life of Her Own (1950) - Overseer (uncredited)
 Again Pioneers (1950) - Ma Ashby
 The Missourians (1950) - Mother Kovacs
 Oh! Susanna (1951) - Mrs. Ledbetter (uncredited)
 Utah Wagon Train (1951) - Sarah Wendover
 She's Working Her Way Through College (1952) - Wardrobe Woman at Burlesque Theatre (uncredited)
 Big Jim McLain (1952) - Mrs. Lexiter
 Prince of Players (1955) - Mary Todd Lincoln (uncredited)
 The Kettles in the Ozarks (1956) - Miz Tinware (uncredited)
 No Time for Sergeants (1958) - Sgt. King's Mother (uncredited)
 Screaming Mimi (1958) - Thelma (uncredited)
 Girl With an Itch (1958) - Cookie

References

External links

 
 
 

1881 births
1967 deaths
Actresses from Chicago
American stage actresses
Vaudeville performers
20th-century American actresses
British emigrants to the United States